Wegener may refer to:

Astronomy 
 29227 Wegener, a main-belt asteroid
 Wegener (lunar crater)
 Wegener (Martian crater)

Places 
 Wegener Range, an Antarctic mountain range
 Mount Wegener, an Antarctic mountain in the Read Mountains in the Shackleton Range
 Wegener Canyon, an undersea canyon
 Wegener Halvo Formation, a geologic formation in Greenland

Businesses 
 Wegener (company), a Dutch media conglomerate
 Alfred Wegener Institute for Polar and Marine Research

Medicine 
 Wegener's granulomatosis, now known as granulomatosis with polyangiitis

People 

 Alfred Wegener (1880–1930), German geologist who originated the theory of continental drift
 Kapitänleutnant Bernhard Wegener, commander of German submarine U-27, killed in one of the two Baralong incidents in 1915
 Bertha Frensel Wegener (1874–1953), Dutch composer and music educator 
 Bobby Wegener, American lawyer and Oklahoma's Secretary of Energy from 2008-2011
 Manuela (singer) (1943–2001), German singer Doris Inge Wegener
 Einar Mogens Wegener (1882–1931), birth name of transsexual pioneer Lili Elbe
 Emmy Wegener (1901–1973), Dutch violinist, pianist, poet and composer
 Frederico or Federico Wegener, aliases of Eduard Roschmann (1908–1977), Nazi SS officer known as the "Butcher of Riga"
 Friedrich Wegener (1907–1990), German pathologist
 Gerda Wegener (1886–1940), Danish illustrator
 Ingo Wegener (1950–2008), German computer scientist
 Kurt Wegener (1878–1964), German polar explorer and meteorologist, brother of Alfred
 Mike Wegener (born 1946), American Major League Baseball pitcher
 Myrton O. Wegener (1917–1991), American farmer, businessman, and politician
 Otto Wegener (1849–1924), French portrait photographer
 Otto Wegener (1881–1938), Danish sports shooter
 Paul Wegener (1874–1948), German actor and film director
 Paul Wegener (Nazi) (1908–1993), German Nazi Party official
 Stephen T. Wegener (born 1952), American psychologist
 Ulrich Wegener (1929–2017), German police officer
 Wilhelm Wegener (1895–1944), German general during World War II 
 Wolfgang Wegener (1875–1956), German admiral and naval historian

See also 
 Wegner

German-language surnames
Occupational surnames